SCAA may refer to:

Scotland's Charity Air Ambulance
South China Athletic Association, an athletic club in Hong Kong
The Specialty Coffee Association of America
The Swedish Committee Against Antisemitism
Civil Aviation Administration (Sweden)